Rudabánya is a town in Borsod-Abaúj-Zemplén county, Hungary.

The town territory was the location of the discovery of a hominid from 12 million years ago, Dryopithecus brancoi (1969).

International relations

Rudabánya is twinned with:

  Dobšiná, Slovakia (2011)
  Borsec, Romania (2012)

External links

  in Hungarian, English and German
 Street map 
 Aerial photographs of Rudabánya

Populated places in Borsod-Abaúj-Zemplén County